Arayik Gevorgyan (born 22 January 1973) is a retired Armenian Freestyle wrestler. He is an Armenian Champion, European Champion, and three-time World Champion. Gevorgyan was awarded the Master of Sports of the USSR, International Class title in 1991 and the Honored Master of Sports of Armenia title in 1995.

Biography
Gevorgyan was born on 22 January 1973 in a village of the Artashat region of Soviet Armenia. He started wrestling in 1984 under the guidance of Razmik Goletsyan. From 1989 to 1991, he was a member of the USSR junior freestyle wrestling team. Gevorgyan became a Junior European Champion in 1991. In 1992, Gevorgyan joined the Armenia espoir freestyle wrestling team. Gevorgyan became an Espoir European Champion in 1992 and an Espoir World Champion in 1993. After that year, Gevorgyan joined the Armenian national freestyle wrestling team. He became a three-time consecutive World Wrestling Champion, having won a gold medal at the 1995 World Wrestling Championships, 1997 World Wrestling Championships and 1998 World Wrestling Championships. Gevorgyan is the first ever wrestler from the independent Armenia to become a World Wrestling Champion in freestyle wrestling. He is also the first European Championship medalist in either Greco-Roman or freestyle wrestling and only the third European Championship gold medalist in freestyle wrestling from the independent Armenia. Gevorgyan is a three-time Olympian, competing at the 1996 Summer Olympics, 2000 Summer Olympics, and 2004 Summer Olympics. He was one of the favorites in 1996 and 2000 but wasn't able to win an Olympic medal. Gevorgyan was voted the Armenian Athlete of the Year for 1997 and 1998. He completed his international wrestling career after the 2004 Olympics in Athens.

References

External links
 
 
 Bundesliga

1973 births
Living people
People from Artashat, Armenia
Armenian male sport wrestlers
Wrestlers at the 1996 Summer Olympics
Wrestlers at the 2000 Summer Olympics
Wrestlers at the 2004 Summer Olympics
Olympic wrestlers of Armenia
World Wrestling Championships medalists
European Wrestling Championships medalists